Uzbekistan Second League is the third highest football league in Uzbekistan.

Members of Uzbekistan Second League 2011

League format
In the second phase participated 14 teams split into three groups: Qarshi, Fergana and Bukhara. The winner of each group promote to First League

Second phase
Zaamin, Neftchi Khamza, Yuzhanin and Bukhoro-2 are promoted to First Division. Zaamin is promoted to first league instead of Khisar because Khisar violated competition regulations. Disciplinary Committee declared the matches of Khisar against Zaamin, Lokomotiv BFK and Neftchi Kumkurgan, to be lost by Khisar by forfeit (0:3) due to an ineligible player in the Khisar team taking part in 2011 matches.

Group Qarshi

Group Ferghana

Group Bukhora

Final standings after last matchday.

References

External links
Championat.uz: Standings and results
pfl.uz: Uzbekistan Professional League

Uzbekistan Second League seasons
3